AWS 2 is a naval and ground radar used for surface warning and air and surface target indication. It was developed in 1957 by the United Kingdom and was primarily designed for installation of destroyer, frigate and corvette but also can be used for installation in the ground.

References 

British inventions
Military radars of the United Kingdom
Military equipment introduced in the 1950s
Naval radars
Ground radars
Royal Navy Radar